First Lady of the Republic of the Union of Myanmar is the title held by the wife of the president or the head of the state. The first lady is also the patron of the Myanmar Women Affairs.

The current first lady Khin Thet Htay (spouse of president Myint Swe) assumed the role in an acting capacity on 1 February 2021.

List of first ladies of Myanmar

References 

"Sao Shwe Thaik's first presidential address to the nation, on January 4, 1948"

Leaders of Myanmar (Burma)

https://query.nytimes.com/gst/fullpage.html?res=950DE4D71F3BF936A35754C0A96F948260

 
Myanmar